Koledari are Slavic traditional performers of a ceremony called koleduvane, a kind of Christmas caroling. It is associated with Koliada, a celebration incorporated later into Christmas.

This type of caroling is called "kolędowanie" in Poland, "коледуване" (koleduvane) in Bulgaria, "colindat" in Romania, "колядування" (koliaduvannia) in Ukraine, and "коледарење" (koledarenje) or "коледе" (kolede) in North Macedonia.

Bulgaria 
The koledari carolers traditionally start their rounds at midnight on Christmas Eve. They visit the houses of their relatives, neighbours and other people in the village. The caroling is usually performed by young men, which are accompanied by an elder one called stanenik. Each caroler carries a stick called gega. They wish the people from the village health, wealth and happiness. The time for the koleduvane is strictly defined by tradition - from midnight to dawn on Christmas Eve. With the power of the songs they have to chase away the demons. By sunrise they lose that power and stop to koleduvat. Preparations began on 20 December. Men are in traditional festive attire with a special decoration on their hats.

North Macedonia 
In North Macedonia, the caroling starts early in the morning on 6 January, which is the Christmas Eve or known in Macedonian as Badnik. Usually kids are caroling in North Macedonia and they go from house to house waking the people up with a song.  They sing songs called koledarski pesni or carols. After the song is finished, the person, that the song is sang for, rewards  the kids with money, fruit, candies, chocolate and other gifts. The kids usually wake up to do this in between 5am and 11am and they go around the whole neighborhood or village.

One of the most popular kolyadkas (songs) in North Macedonia is the following folk song recorded in 1893:

Коледе леде
паднало греде
утепало деде
деде се мачи
баба го квачи
со четири јајца
гускини, шаткини.

Денеска е Коледе,
утре е Божиќ
ќе колеме теле
теле вика леле
не колете мене
ќе ви купам зеље
да месиме пита
да јадеме сите.

Kolede lede
padnalo grede
utepalo dede
dede se mači
baba go kvači
so četiri jajca
guskini, šatkini.

Deneska e Kolede
utre e Božiḱ
ḱe koleme tele
tele vika lele
ne kolete mene
ḱe vi kupam zelje
da mesime pita
da jademe site.

Serbia 

Koledari prepared themselves during several days before the start of the koleda: they practiced the koleda songs, and made their masks and costumes. The masks could be classified into three types according to the characters they represented: the anthropomorphic, the zoomorphic (representing bear, cow, stag, goat, sheep, ox, wolf, stork, etc.), and the anthropo-zoomorphic. The main material from which they were produced was hide. The face, however, could be made separately out of a dried gourd shell or a piece of wood, and then sewn to hide so that the mask could cover all the head. The moustache, beard, and eyebrows were made with black wool, horsehair, or hemp fibers, and the teeth with beans. Zoomorphic and anthropo-zoomorphic masks might have white, black, or red painted horns attached to them. The costumes were prepared from ragged clothes, sheepskins with the wool turned outside, and calf hides. An ox tail with a bell fixed at its end was sometimes attached at the back of them.

The leader of the group was called Grandpa. The other koledari gathered at his house on the eve of koleda, and at midnight they all went out and started their activities. Walking through the streets of the village they shouted and made noise with their bells and ratchets. Most were armed with sabers or clubs. One of them, called Bride, was masked and costumed as a pregnant woman. He held a distaff in his hand and spun hemp fibers. The koledari teased and joked with Bride, which gave a comic note to the koleda. Some of them were called alosniks, the men possessed by the demon ala. There could have been other named characters in the group.

The koledari sung special songs, in which the word koledo, the vocative case of koleda, was inserted in the middle and at the end of each verse.

Besides the singing, the koledari also chased away demons from the household. First they searched the house to find out where the demons hide. They looked everywhere, at the same time shouting, dancing, jumping, knocking on the floor and walls with sticks, and teasing Bride. When they found the demons, they drove them out of the hiding place, and fought with them swinging their sabers and clubs. After the demons were chased away, the koledari briefly danced the kolo, and then blessed the household. As a reward, they received a loaf of bread which the family prepared specially for them, and other food gifts.

Ukraine 

One of the best known folk  Ukrainian koliadka songs is Shchedryk in the 1916 arrangement of Mykola Leontovych. It was later adapted as an English Christmas carol, Carol of the Bells, by Peter J. Wilhousky.

See also 
 Jasličkári
 Koliada
 List of Christmas carols
 Trick-or-treating

References

External links
 Koledari in the Bulgarian tradition
 Macedonian songs for Christmas Eve 
 New Year's customs in Romania and in the world 
 Macedonian songs for kolede 
 Set of traditional songs for Kolede 
 Kolede in Kavadarci 

Belarusian traditions
Bulgarian traditions
Macedonian traditions
Russian traditions
Serbian traditions
Polish traditions
Ukrainian folk music
Slavic Christmas traditions